The Waccamaw people were an Indigenous people of the Southeastern Woodlands, who lived in villages along the Waccamaw and Pee Dee rivers in North and South Carolina in the 18th century.

Language 

Very little remains of the Waccamaw's ancestral Woccon language today, it was one of the two Catawban branches of the Siouan language family.  The language was lost due to devastating population losses and social disruptions during the eighteenth and nineteenth centuries.  It is attested today in a vocabulary of 143 words, printed in 1709.

History 
While the Waccamaw were never populous, the arrival of settlers and their diseases in the 16th century resulted in devastating population loss and dispersal. In 1600, anthropologist James Mooney estimated the population of the "Waccamaw, Winyaw, Hook, &c" at 900 people, while the 1715 census registers only one remaining Waccamaw village with a total population of 106 people, 36 of them men.

According to the early 20th century ethnographer John R. Swanton, the Waccamaw may have been one of the first mainland groups of Natives visited by the Spanish explorers in the 16th century.  Within the second decade of the 16th century, Francisco Gordillo and Pedro de Quexos captured and enslaved several Native Americans, and transported them to the island of Hispaniola where they had a base. Most died within two years, although they were supposed to have been returned to the mainland. One of the men whom the Spanish captured was baptized and learned Spanish.

Called Francisco de Chicora by the Spanish, he worked for Lucas Vázquez de Ayllón. The explorer took him to Spain on a trip. Chicora told the court chronicler Peter Martyr about more than twenty Indigenous peoples who lived in present-day South Carolina, among which he mentioned the "Chicora" and the "Duhare". Their tribal territories comprised the northernmost regions.

Swanton believed that Chicora was referring to the peoples who became known as the Waccamaw and the Cape Fear Indians, respectively.

Eighteenth century
European contact decimated the Waccamaw. Having no natural immunity to endemic Eurasian infectious diseases, such as smallpox and measles, the Waccamaw, like many southeastern Native peoples, had high mortality rates from the new diseases. The 1715 Carolina colonial census listed their population as 610 total, with 210 men. The 1720 census recorded that they had 100 warriors.

By the early 18th century, the Cheraw, a related Siouan people of the Southeastern Piedmont, tried to recruit the Waccamaw to support the Yamasee and other tribes against English colonists during the Yamasee War in 1715. The Cheraw made peace with the English.

The English colonists founded a trading post in Euaunee, "the Great Bluff," in 1716. The Waccamaw engaged in a brief war against the South Carolina colony in 1720, and 60 Waccamaw men, women, and children were either killed or captured by the colonists as a result.

In 1755, John Evans noted in his journal that Cherokee and Natchez warriors killed some Waccamaw and Pedee "in the white people’s settlements."

Nineteenth century
The surviving Waccamaw grew corn for their own use. In the later 19th century, they cultivated tobacco and cotton as commodity crops, on a small scale, as did yeomen among the neighboring African-American freedmen and  European-Americans. Waccamaw Siouan people in the late 19th century in North Carolina farmed diverse crops on inherited lands, but agriculture was depressed. They increasingly turned to wage labor by the end of the century. Men collected turpentine from pine trees to supplement their income, while women grew cash crops, including tobacco and cotton, and /or worked as domestic laborers and farm hands.

In the former slave states, the Waccamaw were frequently recorded as "free persons of color," as whites assumed that Native Americans who exhibited any African-American features were "Black" (in their binary system). Waccamaw cultural communities were not recognized because of racial bias. The US census did not use "Indian" as a category for non-reservation Indians until 1870, and at that time census takers tended to classify residents rather than asking them for self-identification.

John Dimery first appeared on the Horry County Census in 1820 as a "free person of color."  Historian and genealogist Virginia DeMarce and Paul Heinegg have found that 80 percent of the individuals listed as free persons of color in 1790 and 1810 were descended from African Americans free in colonial Virginia. Most of those persons were descended from unions and marriages between white women and African men, people who had lived and worked together as free, servants, or slaves. Some Africans were freed as early as the mid-17th century, giving their descendants an early step up even in the discriminatory society.

Recent history
In 1910, the Waccamaw Siouan Indians, one of eight state-recognized groups in North Carolina, organized a council to oversee community issues. A school funded by Columbus County to serve Waccamaw children opened in 1934. At the time, public education was still racially segregated in the state. Before this, the Waccamaw had been required to send their children to schools for African Americans. 

North Carolina recognized the Waccamaw Siouan Tribe of North Carolina in 1971. The community is centered in Bladen and Columbus counties, North Carolina. They have unsuccessfully tried to gain federal recognition. They hold membership on the NC Commission of Indian Affairs as per NCGS 143B-407, and incorporated as a 501(c)(3) organization in 1977. Lumbee Legal Services, Inc., represents the Waccamaw Siouan Tribe in its administrative process for seeking federal recognition.

In 2005 South Carolina recognized the Waccamaw Indian People, a 501(c)(3) nonprofit organization whose office is in Aynor, South Carolina.

Both organizations claim to descend from the historic Waccamaw people.

Related Siouan-speaking nations

 Akenatsi
 Catawba
 Cheraw
 Moneton
 Mosopelea
 Saponi
 Sewee
 Tutelo

Notes

References

External links
Waccamaw Indians, state-recognized in South Carolina

Native American tribes in North Carolina
Native American tribes in South Carolina
State-recognized tribes in the United States

es:Waccamaw
hr:Waccamaw Indijanci